Heydarabad (also Romanized as Ḩeydarābād; also known as Kharābād, Kheir Abad Arzoo’eyeh, Kheyrābād, and Kheyrābād-e Arzū’īyeh) is a village in Arzuiyeh Rural District, in the Central District of Arzuiyeh County, Kerman Province, Iran. At the 2006 census, its population was 594, in 131 families.

References 

Populated places in Arzuiyeh County